Koeleria glauca, commonly known as blue hair grass, is a grass species of the genus Koeleria. It grows in dunes and other sandy places. It is mainly distributed in eastern Central Europe, with its western outposts in the coastal dunes of Jutland and inland dunes in the Rhine Valley.

Description

References

External links
Flora Europaea 
Nordic virtual flora 

Pooideae